The Chief of the General Staff is the head of the General Staff and the highest ranking officer of the Somaliland Armed Forces. He is appointed by the President of Somaliland, who holds the position of Commander-in-Chief and the head of the Somaliland Armed Forces. The current Chief of the General Staff is Major general Nuh Ismail Tani.

List of Chiefs

References

Military of Somaliland
Chiefs of defence